Future Farmer Records is an independent record label based in San Francisco, California.

Inspired by skateboarding culture Future Farmer was founded in 1996 by San Joaquin Valley natives Jeff Klindt and Dennis Mitchell.

Former label member M. Ward remains the label's biggest commercial success to date.

Artists
 Built Like Alaska
 Cub County
 David Dondero
 For Stars
 Fuck
 Nik Freitas
 Ghosty
 Granfaloon Bus
 The Heavenly States
 The High Violets
 Jackpot
 Jet By Day
 Joaquina
 Kevin Salem
 Matt Keating
 The Minders
 Yuji Oniki
 Righteous Boy
 The High Strung
 Virgil Shaw
 M. Ward
 Wonderlick

See also 
 List of record labels

External links

American independent record labels
Record labels established in 1996
Alternative rock record labels